The Poster Girl Tour was the third concert tour by Swedish singer-songwriter Zara Larsson, in support of her second international studio album Poster Girl (2021). Promoted by Live Nation Entertainment, the tour commenced on 19 November 2021, in Gothenburg, Sweden.  It concluded in Oslo on August 20, comprising 22 shows.

Background 
On 26 May 2021, Larsson announced through social media that she would be touring the Nordic countries in 2021. She also announced that Jelassi, Musti, Emma Steinbakken, Pihlaja and Szim would be the opening acts for the tour. The tickets went on sale on 28 May 2021. Due to COVID-19 concerns, Larsson announced that the date in Helsinki had been cancelled. Before his sudden and unexpected death, the Swedish rapper Einár had been announced as the opening act for the shows in Sweden. Due to demand, Larsson added one date for Skellefteå on 27 November 2021.
 
Before the tour beginning, Larsson performed at several major music festivals, including RIX FM Festival in Stockholm, The Big Feastival in United Kingdom and Manchester Pride Festival in England. In December 2021, Larsson announced the dates for her European major festival tour for June, July and August 2022.

Set list
This set list is from the show on 19 November 2021 in Gothenburg. It is not intended to represent all concerts for the tour.

 "Love Me Land"
 "I Would Like"
 "FFF"
 "Ruin My Life"
 "Last Summer"
 "Poster Girl"
 "Ain't My Fault" / "Way 2 Sexy" 
 "Wow"
 "I Need Love"
 "Carry You Home"
 "Right Here"
 "Like It Is" / "This One's for You"
 "I Can't Fall in Love Without You"
 "Look What You've Done"
 "Lay All Your Love on Me" 
 "Symphony"
 "Säg mig var du står"
 "Never Forget You"
Encore
 "Uncover"
 "Lush Life"

Tour dates

Cancelled shows

References 

 

2021 concert tours
2022 concert tours
Zara Larsson concert tours
Concert tours of Europe